Andrew Robert McIntosh, Baron McIntosh of Haringey, PC (30 April 1933 – 27 August 2010) was a British Labour politician and last elected Principal of the Working Men's College.

Personal life
McIntosh was educated at Haberdasher Aske's Hampstead School, the Royal Grammar School, High Wycombe, Jesus College, Oxford and Ohio State University.

McIntosh was married to the academic Naomi Sargant. McIntosh died in 2010, aged 77, and was survived by two sons and a stepson. He is buried in a family grave in Highgate Cemetery.

Politics
He served as a councillor in the London Borough of Haringey (1964–68). He represented Tottenham on the Greater London Council (1973–83). When Labour won control of the GLC in 1981, McIntosh was leader of the Labour group. A centrist, McIntosh narrowly beat left-winger Ken Livingstone for the leadership. However, the day after Labour won a small majority, he was ousted and Livingstone voted leader of the Labour Group and of the GLC in his place by 30 to 20.

He was raised to the peerage as a life peer on 17 January 1983 as Baron McIntosh of Haringey of Haringey in the County of Greater London. He served as a whip and a culture spokesman in the House of Lords. He was sworn in as a member of the Privy Council in 2002.

Andrew McIntosh was the UK's Minister for the Media and Heritage at the Department for Digital, Culture, Media and Sport from 2003 to 2005. His responsibilities included broadcasting and press regulation, heritage and architecture, libraries, and gambling regulation. He was also spokesman in the House of Lords for HM Treasury from 1997 to 2005.

In September 2005, he became a member of the Parliamentary Assembly of the Council of Europe sitting as Chairman of the Assembly's Committee on Culture, Science and Education from January 2010 and Chairman of its Sub-Committee on the Media from 2008 to 2009. 

Following the passing of a resolution on "Threats to the lives and freedom of expression of journalists" on 27 January 2007 the Council of Europe appointed him its rapporteur on media freedom.

McIntosh became an Honorary Associate of the National Secular Society, a Distinguished Supporter of the British Humanist Association and vice-chair of the All Party Parliamentary Humanist Group.

References

External links
 Government Whips' Office in House of Lords

1933 births
2010 deaths
Burials at Highgate Cemetery
Alumni of Jesus College, Oxford
English humanists
Chairs of the Fabian Society
Councillors in the London Borough of Haringey
Labour Party (UK) life peers
Members of the Greater London Council
Members of the Privy Council of the United Kingdom
Ohio State University alumni
People educated at the Royal Grammar School, High Wycombe
Place of birth missing
Place of death missing
Life peers created by Elizabeth II